Ramian (also Romanized as Rāmīān, Rāmeyān, and Rāmīyān) is a city and capital of, Ramian County in Golestan Province, in northern Iran.  At the 2006 census, its population was 11,719, in 2,831 families.

Ramian was used in Parthian times as a castle. In "Immortal Land" v. III (written by: Zabihollah e Mansoori) says Greek called it "Laboos" and there was a fight between Ashk II and Selucied king. Some say Ramian at that time had great vineries and wines.

Many residents of modern Ramian are from the Shia Azerbaijanis tribe of Qara-Eli (Garaili/Geraili). Genetically, they are a mix of Turkmens and Keraites. Because they were Shia, they had sent to Kalpush to defend people against raids by the Sunni Turkmen and Uzbeks, in Safavid era. They separated other parts (Khorasan -like: Jajarm-, Semnan and Golestan -like: Ramian- provinces in early Qajar in order of Hosseyn-Qoli khan Qajar. Modern Ramian has been constructed at that time. Before, there was on old Ramian (Kohna Ramian) which was that old Ramian.
They are also known as Qizilbash, because they were Shia Qizilbash force of Safavied.

See also
Khorasani Turks
Khorasani Turkish

References

Cities in Golestan Province
Populated places in Ramian County